Jurek Becker (probably 30 September 1937 – 14 March 1997) was a Polish-born German writer, screenwriter and East German dissident. His most famous novel is Jacob the Liar, which has been made into two films. He lived in Łódź during World War II for about two years and survived the Holocaust.

Childhood
Jurek Becker was born, probably, in 1937. His birth date is not entirely clear because his father gave a birth date that was intended to protect the child from deportation. After the war Becker was claimed by a father, but Jurek was never sure if he was his real father, and who said he no longer remembered Jurek's correct birth date. It is probable that Jurek Becker was some years younger than is generally reckoned.

He lived in the Łódź Ghetto as a child. When he was five, he was sent to the Ravensbrück concentration camp and later to Sachsenhausen. His mother was murdered in the Holocaust, but his father survived; father and son were reunited after the war and settled together in East Berlin.

Career
After completing his national service in the East German army in the 1950s, during which time he became firm friends with the actor Manfred Krug, Becker studied philosophy in East Berlin but was expelled for expressing non-conformist views. In the 1960s he wrote film scripts, one of which, Jakob der Lügner ("Jacob the Liar"), he turned into a novel when the film production was halted. It was made into a film by the East German film company DEFA in 1974, and in 1975 became the only East German film ever to be nominated for an Academy Award (in the foreign-language film category), though it did not win. A 1998 remake, starring Robin Williams in the title role, had limited success.

By the mid-1970s differences of opinion with the GDR authorities were becoming apparent, and Becker was one of the original twelve signatories of the petition against the expulsion of writer and singer Wolf Biermann in November 1976. In 1977 he moved from East to West Berlin, though somewhat unusually he retained his East German citizenship. He continued to publish novels and short stories, some on Jewish themes, others not.

Becker died in 1997 of colon cancer that was diagnosed in December 1995.

Works

In German
Becker was primarily a novelist, but he also wrote film and TV scripts. Several of his novels deal with the victims of the Holocaust: Jakob der Lügner, Der Boxer, and Bronsteins Kinder. Jakob der Lügner remains his most successful work.

Jakob der Lügner (1969)
Irreführung der Behörden (1973)
Der Boxer (1976)
 (1978)
Nach der ersten Zukunft (1980) – short story collection
 (1982)
Bronsteins Kinder (1986)
Amanda herzlos (1992)
Warnung von dem Schiftsteller (1990) – lectures
Liebling Kreuzberg (1986 and 1988) – TV series

In English translation
 (1986)
Jacob the Liar (1990)
Bronstein's Children (1999)
The Boxer (2002)
My Father, the Germans and I (2010)

Filmography 
Jacob the Liar, directed by Frank Beyer (1975, based on the novel Jacob the Liar)
, directed by Andreas Dresen (1991, short film, loosely based on the story Romeo)
, directed by Jerzy Kawalerowicz (1991, based on the novel Bronstein's Children)
Sleepless Days, directed by Gabriele Denecke (1991, TV film, based on the novel )
Wenn alle Deutschen schlafen, directed by Frank Beyer (1995, TV film, based on the story Die Mauer)
Jakob the Liar, directed by Peter Kassovitz (1999, based on the novel Jacob the Liar)

Screenwriter
Ohne Pass in fremden Betten (dir. Vladimír Brebera, 1965)
Jungfer, Sie gefällt mir (dir. Günter Reisch, 1969)
 (dir. , 1970)
Jacob the Liar (dir. Frank Beyer, 1975)
 (dir. Frank Beyer, 1977/78)
David (dir. Peter Lilienthal, 1979)
Liebling Kreuzberg (1986–1998, TV series)
The Passenger – Welcome to Germany (dir. Thomas Brasch, 1988)
 (dir. , 1990)
 (dir. Jerzy Kawalerowicz, 1991)
Wir sind auch nur ein Volk (1994–1995, TV series)
Wenn alle Deutschen schlafen (dir. Frank Beyer, 1995, TV film)

References 

Notes

Bibliography
.
.

1937 births
1997 deaths
Writers from Łódź
East German writers
Łódź Ghetto inmates
Ravensbrück concentration camp survivors
Sachsenhausen concentration camp survivors
Heinrich Mann Prize winners
20th-century Polish Jews
Officers Crosses of the Order of Merit of the Federal Republic of Germany
German people of Polish-Jewish descent
Deaths from colorectal cancer
Deaths from cancer in Germany
20th-century German novelists
German male novelists
Jewish concentration camp survivors
20th-century German male writers
Polish emigrants to East Germany
Members of the German Academy for Language and Literature